"John Cougar, John Deere, John 3:16" is a song written by Shane McAnally, Ross Copperman, and Josh Osborne and recorded by New Zealand-born Australian country music singer Keith Urban. It was released on June 9, 2015 as the first single from Urban's 2016 album Ripcord. The song has a slow 1970s funk vibe that carries distinct drum loops and several time changes, with production from Urban and longtime co-producer Dann Huff. The song has received positive reviews from music critics who praised the production and lyrics, as well as Urban's return to traditional country with a brand-new sound.

Background
Urban debuted the song at the Country Radio Seminar in Nashville, Tennessee in February 2015. Urban told The Boot that it "was sent to me a few months ago by one of the songwriters, and I loved it immediately". Lyrically, the song uses several name-drops to illustrate the narrator's influences in life, culminating in "I learned everything I needed to know from John Cougar, John Deere, John 3:16." Musically, it features a "slowed, almost '70s funk vibe with distinct drum loops and several time changes". Urban recorded the song at Blackbird Studios in Nashville, and co-produced it with longtime producer Dann Huff. Urban told Nash Country Weekly that he was having difficulty creating a suitable vocal track until he took a bass guitar from the studio wall and played a bass line which he had originally intended to replace with one from a session musician, but ultimately left in the final recording.

Release
The song was released to radio on 9 June 2015, and Urban performed it the next day on the CMT Music Awards.

Critical reception
Billy Dukes of Taste of Country reviewed the song with favor, saying that Keith Urban "returns to more traditional country themes while continuing to push his sound in new directions" and that it "has an everyman quality to it that heightens the song’s sharpness. It’s a good, mellow groove that won’t soon get old." Tammy Ragusa of Nash Country Weekly gave the song an A− grade, saying that it was "one of the catchiest, most infectious songs of the summer" and "Dann Huff lets the song's arrangement ebb and flow". She also praised the lyrics, saying "there is some depth and a message."

The song was nominated for Best Country Solo Performance at the 58th Annual Grammy Awards but lost to Chris Stapleton's "Traveller".

Chart performance
"John Cougar, John Deere, John 3:16" debuted at number 47 on the US Hot Country Songs chart, on the week before its official release, and reached its peak at number 24 the following week. The song also debuted on the US Country Airplay chart at number 26, and at number seven on the Country Digital Songs chart selling 36,000 copies. The song peaked at number two on the US Hot Country Songs chart on the week of September 19, 2015, and number two on the US Country Airplay chart a week later. The song also reached its peak at number 40 on the US Billboard Hot 100 on the week of October 10, 2015. This is Keith's eighteenth top 40 hit on the US Billboard Hot 100. As of February 2016, the song has sold 663,000 copies in the US. On February 24, 2017, the single was certified platinum by the Recording Industry Association of America (RIAA) for combined sales and streaming data of over a million units in the United States.

Music video
The music video was directed by Shane Drake and premiered in August 2015.

Personnel
From Ripcord liner notes.

Musicians
 Matt Chamberlain – drums, programming
 Ross Copperman – gang vocals
 Jerry Flowers – background vocals
 Dann Huff – acoustic guitar, gang vocals
 Charlie Judge – keyboards
 Andy Snyder – gang vocals
 Russell Terrell – background vocals
 Keith Urban – acoustic guitar, bass guitar, electric guitar, vocals
 Jonathan Yudkin – violin

Technical
Joe Baldridge – engineering
Eric Lijestrand – acoustic guitar overdubs
Serban Ghenea – mixing
John Hanes – engineering
Dann Huff – production, engineering
Keith Urban – production

Charts

Weekly charts

Year-end charts

Certification

References

Songs about musicians
Cultural depictions of rock musicians
Cultural depictions of country musicians
2015 singles
2015 songs
Keith Urban songs
Capitol Records Nashville singles
Song recordings produced by Dann Huff
Songs written by Ross Copperman
Songs written by Shane McAnally
Songs written by Josh Osborne
Music videos directed by Shane Drake